The year 1547 in science and technology included a number of events, some of which are listed here.

Events
 John Dee  visits the Low Countries to study navigation with Gemma Frisius.
 The first chair of mathematics at the University of Heidelberg is given to the physician Jacob Curio.
 Charles de Bovelles publishes La Geometrie practique in Paris, with assistance from Oronce Finé.
 Girolamo Gabuccini publishes the first separate treatise on parasitic worms.

Births
 February 18 – Bahāʾ al-dīn al-ʿĀmilī, Lebanese-born philosopher and astronomer (died 1621)
 March 1 – Rudolph Goclenius, German philosopher and polymath (died 1628)
 November 26 – Nicolaus Taurellus, German philosopher and scientist (died 1606)

Deaths
 January 16 – Johannes Schöner, German astronomer and cartographer (born 1477)
 December 2 – Hernán Cortés, Spanish explorer (born 1485)

References

 
16th century in science
1540s in science